Zinc finger, also known as ZDHHC2, is a human gene.

References

Further reading